The Lakeland Athletic Conference was a high school athletic conference created in 1980 and disbanded in 2014.  Founding members were Buchanan Bucks, Berrien Springs Shamrocks, Brandywine Bobcats, Cassopolis Rangers, Edwardsburg Eddies, and River Valley Mustangs. Later, Dowagiac, Lakeshore, Lake Michigan Catholic were added before they all later departed.

In the 2003-2004 season, the Bridgman Bees joined the L.A.C. conference.

Former members include Bridgman Bees (football only), Dowagiac Chieftains, Edwardsburg Eddies, Lake Michigan Catholic Lakers, Lakeshore Lancers, and River Valley Mustangs. In 1991, Lake Michigan Catholic left the conference after joining from the Red Arrow Conference in 1989. In 1999, Lakeshore left the conference followed by Dowagiac, who left in 2001 after winning conference their last two years in Basketball (sharing with Berrien Springs in 2000). River Valley left the conference in 2010 to join the Red Arrow Conference. Bridgman became an independent football program in 2010. While Edwardsburg joined the Wolverine Conference in 2012.

Member Schools 
During the final year of conference play in 2013-14, the following schools were members:
Brandywine High School
Bridgman High School (except football)
Buchanan High School
Cassopolis High School

Membership Timeline

Conference Champions (Football)

Conference Champions (Boys Basketball)

References

Michigan high school sports conferences
1980 establishments in Michigan